Agony of Death is the tenth studio album by German thrash metal band Holy Moses. The album was released in three different dates of 2008, on 26 September in Germany, 29 September in Europe and 7 October in the United States through SPV/Steamhammer.

Track listing

Personnel 
Band members
Sabina Classen – vocals, executive producer
Michael Hankel – guitar, producer, mastering, mixing
Oliver Jaath – guitar, backing vocals
Thomas Neitsch – bass
Atomic Steiff – drums

Additional musicians
Ferdy Doernberg – keyboards, samples, slide guitar on "Through Shattered Minds"
Janos Murri – guitar solo on "Imagination" and "Alienation"
Ralph Santolla – guitar solo on "World in Darkness" and "Dissociative Disorder"
Trevor Peres – guitar solo on "Angels in War"
Karlos Medina – bass on "Imagination"
Henning Basse – backing vocals on "Schizophrenia"
The Wolf – backing vocals on "Imagination"
Schmier – backing vocals on "The Cave"

References 

2008 albums
Holy Moses albums
SPV/Steamhammer albums